Sviny is a municipality and village in Tábor District in the South Bohemian Region of the Czech Republic. It has about 300 inhabitants.

Administrative parts
The village of Kundratice is an administrative part of Sviny.

References

Villages in Tábor District